Concentrix is an American business services company specializing in customer engagement and business performance. Concentrix was a subsidiary of SYNNEX Corporation (NYSE: SNX) since 2006 and went public as an independent company on December 1, 2020. Concentrix is headquartered in Fremont, California.

History and acquisitions 
Concentrix was founded in 1983, its heritage can be traced back to 1973 to its insurance administration business solutions and services which were acquired in 2013 by Concentrix from IBM. Concentrix has grown through multiple acquisitions bringing on board eight companies since 2006. Two of the acquisitions that are especially notable include the IBM Worldwide Customer Care Services Business(known as IBM Daksh) and the Minacs Group Pte.

On June 28, 2018, Convergys and Synnex announced they have reached a definitive agreement in which SYNNEX would acquire Convergys for $2.43 billion in combined stock and cash, and integrate it with Concentrix.

On October 5, 2018, Convergys Corporation and Synnex announced that they have completed the merger.

In May 2022, Concentrix announced the organisation has a definitive agreement to acquire U.S based B2B customer experience technology and solutions company, ServiceSource International, Inc. (NASDAQ: SREV). The deal was worth $131 million.

Controversies 
Multiple former Concentrix employees have described their dissatisfaction with the company's high turnover culture and low wages. Concentrix has also been sued for wage theft.

In July 2021, Pro Publica published an article describing the world of work-at-home customer service provider companies including Concentrix. The article mentions how workers are demanded to provide quality support while getting low hourly wages. Concentrix claims to be based in the Bay Area but most of its work force is based outside of the US, noticeable in Canada, India and Portugal. “You don’t know if you’re going to have a job tomorrow.” 

In 2014, Concentrix won a £75 million contract from the UK's tax authority, the HMRC, to review two million tax credit claims for fraud and incorrect tax credit awards. Tax credits are a form of UK social welfare benefit paid out to parents and workers on low incomes.

In 2016, Concentrix was receiving heavy criticism from the cross-party parliamentary committee on welfare for incorrectly closing the claims of tens of thousands of claimants, leaving them without money for essentials. A government report disclosed that of 36,000 appeals against Concentrix, 87% were upheld. In September 2016, the HMRC announced that it would not renew the contract, due to expire in 2017, although the Treasury has resisted calls for a full inquiry thus far. As a result of Concentrix's failings, thousands of claimants are also due to receive back-payments for incorrectly stopped claims. Processing the resultant case reviews cost HMRC £43 million.

References

External links
 

https://www.concentrixovertimelawsuit.com 

Business services companies of the United States
Companies based in Fremont, California
Business services companies established in 1983
1983 establishments in California
Companies listed on the Nasdaq
Corporate spin-offs